Kambia may refer to:
 Kambia (Sierra Leone)
 Kambia District in northwestern Sierra Leone
 an alternative spelling of the Greek place name Kampia (disambiguation)

See also
 Cambia (disambiguation)
 Cambria (disambiguation)
 Kumbia (disambiguation)